Bengal is an unincorporated community in Saint Louis County, Minnesota, United States, located about 3 hours north of Minneapolis.

The community is located immediately southwest of the city of Hibbing (boundary line), and south of the city of Keewatin, at the intersection of Stuart Road and County Road 944.

County Road 16 (CR 16) and State Highway 73 (MN 73) are both nearby.

The boundary line between Saint Louis and Itasca counties is in the vicinity.  The community of Silica is also nearby.

References

 Official State of Minnesota Highway Map – 2011/2012 edition

Unincorporated communities in Minnesota
Unincorporated communities in St. Louis County, Minnesota